Tandberg is a surname and name of several companies:

People
Bernhard Tandberg, Norwegian farmer and politician
Carl Frederick Tandberg (1910–1988), American bass fiddle musician
Christian Hansen Tandberg, Norwegian farmer and politician
Erik Tandberg, Norwegian bobsledder
Gulbrand Eriksen Tandberg, Norwegian farmer and politician
Gudbrand Bernhardsen Tandberg, Norwegian politician
Jack Tandberg (1931–1981), American cameraman killed while filming The Five of Me
Jens Frølich Tandberg (1852–1922), Norwegian bishop of Oslo
Johan Jørgen Tandberg, Norwegian priest and politician
Olle Tandberg, Swedish heavyweight champion
Ron Tandberg (1943–2018), Australian illustrator and political cartoonist
Vebjørn Tandberg (1904–1978), Norwegian electronics engineer and industrialist

Companies
 Tandberg, manufacturer of video conferencing equipment, based in Oslo, Norway
 Tandberg Audio, defunct manufacturer of high-end-audio equipment
 Tandberg Data, manufacturer of computer terminals and data storage devices
 Tandberg Educational, now part of SANAKO, a provider of language teaching products
 Tandbergs Radiofabrikk, the original company (radio factory) founded in 1933 by Vebjørn Tandberg
 Tandberg Storage, manufacturer of magnetic tape data storage devices
 Tandberg Television, manufacturer of professional digital video equipment

See also
Johan Christian Tandberg Castberg

Norwegian-language surnames